Ragnhild Hemsing (born 15 February 1988 in Valdres, Norway) is a Norwegian classical violinist and older sister of the classical violinist Eldbjørg Hemsing.

Biography 
Hemsing began to play the violin when she was five years old and was invited to enroll at the Barratt Due Institute of Music in Oslo at nine. She studied in Vienna with Boris Kuschnir.

When she was 14, Hemsing made her debut with the Bergen Philharmonic Orchestra, where she performed the Mendelssohn Violin Concerto, and with the Trondheim Symphony Orchestra. The following year she performed with the Oslo Philharmonic Orchestra. She has performed with the Danish National Radio Symphony Orchestra, the Ukrainian National Philharmonic Orchestra, and the Kazan State Orchestra in Russia, among others. She performed with Norway’s leading orchestras, including the Oslo Philharmonic Orchestra, the Bergen Philharmonic Orchestra, and the Stavanger Symphony Orchestra.

Hemsing was awarded the Sparre Olsen-prisen in 2005 for her "exceptionally instrumental endowment that grabs the audience with her vivid, passionate and brilliant performance", according to the jury.

Hemsing plays on a Francesco Ruggeri violin built in Cremona in 1694 on loan from the Dextra Musica Foundation.

Appearances
She appeared at concert halls across Norway, including the Bergen International Festival, the Oslo Chamber Music Festival, Hardingtonar Festival, and Førde International World Music Festival, where she has been combining folk programmes with classical repertoire. As a recitalist, she has also performed at the Northern Lights in Tromsø and the Stavanger, Trondheim, and Harstad International Chamber Music Festivals, and at the Wigmore Hall, the Verbier Festival, Bellerive Festival in Switzerland and AlpenKlassik in Germany, amongst others. In 2011 together with Leif Ove Andsnes and Tine Thing Helseth, she performed at the Cheltenham festival.

Hemsing has performed at the Nobel Peace Prize Concert. With her sister, Eldbjørg Hemsing, she recorded a 60-minute documentary on the life of the famous Norwegian violinist Ole Bull, which received a special EBU award. In 2013 she was awarded the Beethoven Ring at the annual Beethoven Festival in Bonn.

Honors 
2003: First Prize and European Union Prize at the Kocian International Violin Competition in the Czech Republic
2003: First Prize and Special Prize at the European Music Prize for Youth
2005: Sparre Olsen-prisen
2013: Beethoven Ring to the best concert performed during the annual Beethoven Festival in Bonn

Discography 
 2011: YR' (Simax)
 2011: Johan Halvorsen: Orchestral Works Volume 3 (Chandos), with Marianne Thorsen and the Bergen Philharmonic Orchestra conducted by Neeme Järvi
 2011: Varde (Kvarts and Hemsing), with Kvarts and Eldbjørg Hemsing
 2017: Northern Timbre'' (2L), with Tor Espen Aspaas

References

External links

 
 The Hemsing Festival
 Interview in german with the classical portal Classicpoint.net
 Johan Halvorsen Musikkfest 2015
 Konzertdirektion Martin Müller
 YR - Ragnhild Hemsing & Hallgrim Hansegård (www.frikar.com) on YouTube

Norwegian classical violinists
Barratt Due Institute of Music alumni
People from Valdres
1988 births
Living people
21st-century Norwegian singers
21st-century Norwegian women singers
21st-century classical violinists
Women classical violinists